Very Reverend Oleksandr Malynovskyi (12 January 1889 in Zhukiv, Austro-Hungarian Empire /present day in Zolochiv Raion, Lviv Oblast, Ukraine/ – 18 November 1957 in Bradford, United Kingdom) was a Greek Catholic hierarch. He served as the Apostolic Exarch of the Apostolic Exarchate of Lemkowszczyzna from 5 February 1941 until his resignation in September 1945.

Life
Oleksandr Malynovskyi was born in the family of the Ukrainian Greek-Catholic priest Rev. Ivan and his wife Valeriya (née Perfetska) Malynovskyi in 1889 in the Ukrainian Catholic Archeparchy of Lviv.

Military career
After graduation of the male gymnasium in Przemyśl in 1906, he joined Faculty of Law of the Lviv University and subsequently enter the ⁣Austro-Hungarian Army. Participated in the I World War in rank of oberleutnant and after proclamation of independence of the West Ukrainian People's Republic he joined the Ukrainian Galician Army, until his retirement in 1919.

Ecclesiastical Service
Malynovskyi joined the Greek-Catholic Theological Seminary in Lviv (1921–1925) and was ordained as priest in 1925 by Metropolitan Andriy Sheptytsky for the Ukrainian Catholic Archeparchy of Lviv, after completed his studies. After the one-year parish work, Fr. Malynovskyi become prefect (1926–1932) and vice-rector (1932–1939) in the Theological Seminary in Lviv. From 1940 until 1941 he served as Vicar General of the Apostolic Administration of Lemkowszczyzna.

On 5 February 1941, Fr. Malynovskyi was appointed as Apostolic Administrator (and later – Apostolic Exarch) of the Apostolic Administration of Lemkowszczyzna (that later was elevated in the rank of Apostolic Exarchate) without dignity of bishop.

In September 1945 he resigned as Apostolic Exarch and escaped in the West, threatened with arrest and deportation to the Soviet Union. He became prefect of the Ukrainian Theological Seminary in Hirschberg, Germany (1946–1948) and after transfer the Seminary to Culemborg, Netherlands, it rector (1948–1950). His last years, Monsignor Malynovskyi spent in the United Kingdom, where he served as Vicar General for the Ukrainian Greek-Catholics (1951–1957) and Vicar General of the Apostolic Exarchate of England and Wales (1957). He died on 18 November 1957 at the age 68.

References

1889 births
1957 deaths
People from Lviv Oblast
People from the Kingdom of Galicia and Lodomeria
University of Lviv alumni
Lviv Seminary alumni
Ukrainian Eastern Catholics
Ukrainian Austro-Hungarians
British people of Ukrainian descent
Ukrainian emigrants to the United Kingdom
Ukrainian politicians before 1991
West Ukrainian People's Republic people
Ukrainian Galician Army people
Austro-Hungarian military personnel of World War I
Ukrainian people of the Polish–Ukrainian War